The former Stenløse Municipality covered an area of , and had a total population of 13,384 (2005).

Main town was Stenløse.

History
On January 1, 2007 Stenløse municipality ceased to exist as the result of Kommunalreformen ("The Municipality Reform" of 2007). It was merged with Ledøje-Smørum and Ølstykke municipalities to form the new Egedal municipality.

In 2006, the neighboring municipalities were Ledøje-Smørum to the southeast, Ølstykke to the west (now both merged into Egedal municipality), Ballerup and Værløse to the east, Farum to the northeast, Allerød to the north, Slangerup to the northwest, and Gundsø to the south.

Former municipalities of Denmark